Polyscias crassa is a species of plant in the family Araliaceae. It is endemic to Seychelles. It is threatened by habitat loss.

References

crassa
Endemic flora of Seychelles
Taxonomy articles created by Polbot